Technological University (Hpa-An) is a university under the Ministry of Science and Technology. It is located in Hpa-an Township, Kayin State, Myanmar.

History 
The University was founded in 1993 as Government Technical High School (Hpa-an) beside the (Hpa-an-Donyin) road in field No.(1185). It had been transformed as Government Technological Institute from 12 August 1998 and then it had been upgraded as Government Technological College on 28 December 2000. From the board of Education Committee of Government of Union of Myanmar promoted the college to be university level as Technological University (Hpa-an) from the date of 20 January 2007.

Department
 Civil Engineering Department
 Electronic and Communications Engineering Department
 Electrical Power Engineering Department
 Mechanical Engineering Department
 Academic Department

Currently Running Engineering Courses
 Civil Engineering
 Electronic and Communication Engineering
 Electrical Power Engineering
 Mechanical Power Engineering

Degree Programs
 Bachelor of Technology (B.Tech.)
 Bachelor of Engineering (B.E.)
 Master of Engineering (M.E.)

References

Buildings and structures in Kayin State
Technological universities in Myanmar